Counter-insurgency aircraft or COIN aircraft are a specialized variety of military light attack aircraft, designed for counter-insurgency operations, armed reconnaissance, air escort of ground forces, and ground support against "low-intensity engagements"; usually irregular groups of insurgents armed with aircraft artillery and/or portable rockets.

Roles
Some of the roles carried out by counter-insurgency aircraft include:
Transportation in support of combatants and civilians alike, including casualty evacuation (CASEVAC).
Intelligence gathering, surveillance, and reconnaissance.
Psychological operations (PSYOPs) through leaflet drops, loudspeakers, and radio broadcasts.
Air-to-ground attack against soft targets.

For an aircraft—whether fixed-wing or rotary—to effectively carry out all these roles, it should have specification characteristics such as low loitering speed, long endurance, simplicity in maintenance, and the capability to perform short or vertical take-offs and landings from makeshift and roughly constructed runways.

History

Colonial times
The first use of counter-insurgency aircraft was in the 1920s and 1930s during some of the colonial wars, in nations like Ethiopia and Iraq. The benefits offered by even a single aircraft in tasks such as reconnaissance or strafing small groups of individuals proved immeasurable. As the British found in Iraq in the 1920s and from some encounters within the frontiers of Pashtunistan, aircraft stripped away many of the advantages that traditional insurgents had held. It also offered a way of inflicting direct and cost-effective retaliation on the communities that supported the guerrilla.
No special plane was developed. Regular military aircraft were used. It was not unusual for many air forces to field dual role planes: bomber and transport.

Post colonial wars

By the late 1950s, French air operations in the Algerian War was decidedly counter-insurgent in nature, with helicopters such as the Piasecki H-21 being used not only to carry infantry, but also machine guns and rocket launchers on an ad hoc basis, to reach FLN guerilla positions on otherwise inaccessible mountain ridges and peaks.

In the early 1960s it was clear enough for US planners a plane would be needed for guerrilla wars in Asia or Africa. As a consequence U.S. Army tested armed versions of the YAT-37D Dragonfly, A4D-1 Skyhawk and G.91. The tests were good but  the Army was prohibited from operating fixed-wing aircraft in combat.
As late as the Vietnam War, counter-insurgency missions were flown by existing aeroplanes and helicopters, sometimes hastily adapted for the role, notable examples being the North American T-28 Trojan and Douglas A-1 Skyraider. Eventually, as the US budget allowed it, dedicated specialized counter-insurgency aircraft began to be produced for Vietnam war. Other countries adapted existing training planes to COIN and light attack. Examples including:

 
A new approach of COIN were the gunships created by the US. A gunship is an aircraft having laterally-mounted heavy armaments (i.e. firing to the side) to attack ground or sea targets. These gunships were configured to circle the target instead of performing strafing runs. Such aircraft have their armament on one side harmonized to fire at the apex of an imaginary cone formed by the aircraft and the ground when performing a pylon turn (banking turn).

In the Vietnam War, the old Douglas C-47 Skytrain transport was successfully modified by the United States Air Force with side-firing Miniguns for circling attacks. It was the later and larger Lockheed AC-130  that became a notable gunship in US military aviation. These heavily armed aircraft used a variety of weapon systems, including 7.62 mm GAU-2/A Miniguns, 20 mm (0.787 in) M61 Vulcan six-barrel rotary cannons, 25 mm (0.984 in) GAU-12/U Equalizer five-barreled rotary cannons, 30 mm Mk44 Bushmaster II chain guns, 40 mm (1.58 in) L/60 Bofors autocannons, and 105 mm (4.13 in) M102 howitzers. The Douglas AC-47 Spooky, the Fairchild AC-119, and the AC-130 Spectre/Spooky, were vulnerable, and meant to operate only after achieving air superiority. Smaller gunship designs such as the Fairchild AU-23 Peacemaker and the Helio AU-24 Stallion were also designed by the United States during the Vietnam War. These aircraft were meant to be cheap and easy to fly and maintain, and were to be given to friendly governments in Southeast Asia to assist with counter-insurgency operations, eventually seeing service with the Khmer National Air Force, Royal Thai Air Force, and Republic of Vietnam Air Force as well as limited use by the United States Air Force.

See also
Gunship
Light Attack/Armed Reconnaissance (LAAR) Program

References

Works cited
 
 

Military aircraft by type
Counterinsurgency